Oldřich Duras (also Důras; 30 October 1882, Pchery, Bohemia, then Austria-Hungary  – 5 January 1957, Prague, then Czechoslovakia) was a leading Czech chess master of the early 20th century. FIDE awarded him the title of International Grandmaster in 1950, when the title was first introduced, in recognition of his achievements in the early twentieth century. Duras retired from active play after 1914.

Among his noted tournament wins (all shared) are Bremen (1905), Prague (1908), Vienna (1908) and Breslau (1912). He had plus scores against Richard Teichmann (+6-2=6), David Janowski (+3-1=0), Carl Schlechter (+2-1=11) and Aron Nimzowitsch (+3-2=3), and level scores with Siegbert Tarrasch and Géza Maróczy. He lost the one game he played with Emanuel Lasker, had a draw and loss against José Raúl Capablanca, and heavy minus scores against Akiba Rubinstein, Ossip Bernstein and Milan Vidmar and was one game behind with Frank Marshall (+7-8=5).

Duras was also a noted chess composer.

The Duras Gambit is named after him.

References

External links 
 

1882 births
1957 deaths
20th-century chess players
Chess grandmasters
Czech chess players
Chess composers
People from Kladno District